C'est La Vie  is the second studio album by Brazilian girl group Rouge. The album is the successor to the band's debut album, Rouge (2002), which sold more than two million copies, having as main hit the song "Ragatanga". The album features zouk as the main style in the songs "Brilha La Luna" and "Vem Cair na Zueira", as well as international versions such as "Eu Quero Fugir" (version for "Runaway" by The Corrs) and "C'est La Vie" (version of the song of the same name of the band B*Witched).

C'est La Vie was certified platinum and has sold over 350,000 copies. Over 100,000 copies of the album were sold in just one week. In 2003, the album appeared at number 17 in the list of the 20 most sold albums in Brazil according to the ABPD. A few weeks after its release, the album was reissued in a special edition, a CD and DVD kit that features the making of recording and the transition of the girls into the new phase. In addition to the behind-the-scenes of the music video of "Brilha La Luna", among other featurettes. About 50,000 copies of the kit were sold, giving the group the gold certificate.

Three singles were released from the album: "Brilha La Luna", which has managed to lead the charts, and the romantic "Um Anjo Veio Me Falar", which became the second most popular single of the girls' careers. Both songs broke out on radios across the country and "Vem Cair na Zueira". Also in 2003, they toured Latin America and Portugal to promote the album. The album also spanned the DVD A Festa dos Seus Sonhos (2003), which in addition to the show counted as a bonus the two music videos from the album.

The album was a success in award shows, winning 13 trophies, including 4 "Capricho Awards", 2 "Meus Prêmios Nick", 4 "Universal Musical Trophy", 1 "Multishow Brazilian Music Award" besides being nominated for the Latin Grammy in the category "Best Brazilian Pop Album", being the first and only indication of the group.

Background
After the success of its predecessor, the self-titled Rouge (2002), C'est La Vie brought to prominence the zouk genre that already was a hit in other parts of the world, mainly in Europe. The genre has similarities with lambada and arose in the Antilles. According to the idealizer and producer of the album, Rick Bonadio, the bet was in the rhythm mixed with pop. According to Luciana Andrade, "after Ragatanga, everyone expects us to have something more to show. What we have to say is that we trust Rick and Sony [Music's] professionals". Patrícia Lissa points out that there was more interaction among the members at work, saying: "In this album, we participated in meetings with Rick Bonadio, to help choose the repertoire, we heard songs that were sent [...]"

Fantine Thó, also a member of the group, commented on the new work:

About being under the pressure of having to repeat the same success of the debut album, the girls were recognized that they underwent it majorly: "we felt pressured, but tried not to think about it," Patricia said. "We wanted to be true and this is what will make the album have the quality of the first. If it will sell, that is a consequence."

Recording and songs

The repertoire of C'est La Vie consists mainly of versions of older songs made by international composers and songs written by Rick Bonadio himself, as it happened in the first album. The track that opens the album, "C'est La Vie", is a version of the song of the same name by the Irish girl group "B*Witched". The version of the song, that for some critics, recalls the hit  "Beijo Molhado", by Milton Guedes. "Brilha La Luna", written by Rick Bonadio, has a "caliente" (hot) appeal and a rhythm called "pop zouk". The song "Me Faz Feliz" is Milton Guedes's version of the song "Heavenly." Already "Quando Chega a Noite", brings a novelty, is a disco music, sung for the most part by Karin Hils. The song is a version of the song "Llega la Noche", origiginally by the Argentinean girl group "Bandana", formed also in "Popstars", of Argentina. One of the highlights of the album is the track "Um Anjo Veio Me Falar", written by Aline, Fantine, Karin, Luciana and Patrícia, in partnership with Rick Bonadio. The song is a version of the song "Angel In My Heart", by  the British pop band "Hear'Say". The pop song "Fantasma" was written by Fúlvio Márcio, who wrote some tracks from the group's eponymous debut album.

"Vem Cair na Zueira", also signed by Rick Bonadio, follows the same style of "Brilha La Luna", having a great Latin appeal, closer to the zouk root. "Dentro de Mim" is written by Charles Midnight, who has written songs for Joe Cocker and James Brown. "When I asked him for a composition for the Rouge album, he said he already knew the band and their work, and so did all the other foreign authors we talked to," said Rick Bonadio. One of the members Luciana Andrade favorite songs is "Eu quero Fugir", the Portuguese version for "Runaway", hit by Irish band The Corrs. "When I moved to São Paulo and started to get involved with music, my friends always said that The Corrs had everything to do with my style," Luciana recalled. Fantine Thó made her debut as a songwriter in the ballad "Um Dia Sem Você". "I used to sing more black ballads and even rap, but my favorite album track comes in a more pop/rock version," explains Aline Wirley about "Um Dia Sem Você". In the song, she and Fantine do a duet, while the other girls do the chorus. Luciana also ventures into the composition, alongside Rick Bonadio in the track "Abra o Seu Coração".

Singles 
"Brilha La Luna", was released as the lead single from the album on 6 May 2003. The song, which is derived from zouk, was a hit on the charts. The album's second single, the ballad, "Um Anjo Veio Me Falar", was released in 8 July 2003, and also became a success, becoming the band's second most famous song. The song was also part of the soundtrack to the soap opera Canavial de Paixões by Sistema Brasileiro de Televisão. The fourth and final single from the album was, "Vem Cair na Zueira", was released in 29 November 2003, and also follows the same zouk line adopted in "Brilha la Luna", but with a little more Latin rhythms. The group participated in the movie Xuxa Abracadabra (2003), presenting the song, which extracted a music video.

Release and promotion
To promote the album, the label released a special edition, containing a kit with CD and DVD, counting on the making of which registers the transformation of the girls to the new phase of the group. In addition to backstage of the music video of "Brilha La Luna", multimedia material and more. To promote the album on television, the group released "C'est La Vie" on Gugu's show TV, singing the single "Brilha la Luna", "Vem Cair na Zueira", an a cappella from "Um Anjo Veio Me Falar" and "Me Faz Feliz", besides the singles "Ragatanga" and "Não Dá pra Resistir". The group also went to the Bom Dia & Cia children's show where they had an entire week of the show (Monday to Friday) dedicated to the girls who sang old and new hits such as "Ragatanga", "Brilha La Luna" and made an a cappella of "Um Anjo Veio Me Falar", also gave interviews to TV host Jackeline Petkovic who also learned the choreographies of the Rouge, were also to Falando Francamente da Sônia Abrão, singing "Brilha la Luna", "Um Anjo Veio Me Falar", and an excerpt from the unpublished "Um Dia Sem Você", attending a fan request. The band also went to Sabadaço, singing the singles "Brilha la Luna" and "Um Anjo Veio Me Falar", in addition to the title track "C'est La Vie." girls also promoted the album on Hebe'''s show, in addition to participating in the show's TV Eliana, É Show, Pânico na TV, Dia Dia, Melhor da Tarde and Chat Show Terra.

Tour

The group also promoted the album with two tours: the first was the Brilha La Tour in 2003, and the second was the C'est La Vie Tour in 2003. The Brilha la Tour featured 15 songs, including 7 songs from the new album . The C'est La Vie Tour included 17 songs, including 11 songs from "C'est La Vie", including "Um Dia Sem Você", "Eu Quero Fugir", "Delírios" and "Dentro de Mim" who were not present on the previous tour.

The group also released a DVD titled A Festa dos Seus Sonhos (The Feast of Their Dreams), which celebrated 1 year of the group, among the tracks of the new album were the songs "C'est La Vie", "Me Faz Feliz", "Um Anjo Veio Me Falar", "Fantasma", "Quando Chega a Noite", "Vem Cair na Zueira" e "Brilha La Luna".

Spanish version
A version of the album "C'est La Vie" was recorded in Spanish, to be released the same year. But with the departure of the member Luciana, the CD and the project of the 4th DvD ended up being canceled. The edition of the album "C'est La Vie" in Spanish, includes versions of songs of the own and some of the first album. The song "Um anjo veio me falar", also won, in addition to the Spanish version, a music video, which was even comrecializado, where still today, has access. In 2012, it was recorded that the songs of the album leaked on the Internet and discovered by YouTube.

Track listing

Awards
The album was a success in the awards, being indicated to 9 different prizes, being indicated the total to 16, and winning 13 prizes. The song "Brilha La Luna" won the awards for Best Music at "Capricho Awards", "Meus Prêmios Nick", "Trophy" Universal Musical Trophy, "Musical Universe" and the "Zero Magazine Award". The band also won the "Multishow Brazilian Music Award" in the Best Group category.

The group also achieved a 2004 Latin Grammy nomination in the "Best Brazilian Pop Album" category, being the band's first and only nomination. The DVD A Festa dos Seus Sonhos'', also received 2 awards, in "Capricho Awards 2004" and "Troféu Universo Musical 2004", in addition to being nominated to the "Multishow Award of Brazilian Music" in the category "Best DVD".

Charts

Weekly charts

Year-end charts

Certifications

See also
List of best-selling girl groups
List of best-selling girl groups#Best-selling girl group albums

Notes

Rouge (group) albums
2003 albums
Albums produced by Rick Bonadio